Vrhpolje is a village in the Municipality of Hrpelje-Kozina in the Littoral region of Slovenia close to the border with Italy.

The local church, built on a hill above the settlement, is dedicated to Saint Thomas and belongs to the Parish of Draga.

References

External links
Vrhpolje on Geopedia

Populated places in the Municipality of Hrpelje-Kozina